Withered Murder is the third of the collaborations of Anthony Shaffer and Peter Shaffer. The previous two books were published under the pseudonym Peter Antony while this one was published "by A. & P. Shaffer". It was first published by Gollancz in London in 1955 and then a year later in New York by Macmillan as part of their 'Cock Robin Mystery' imprint.

As in How Doth the Little Crocodile?, the story follows their eccentric detective Mr. Verity and his unique ways of solving murders. Again, as in How Doth The Little Crocodile? the detective's name was changed to Mr. Fathom in the US edition.

These books are now long out of print and copies in excellent condition can sell for high prices.

External links
Anthony Shaffer website

British mystery novels
1955 British novels
Victor Gollancz Ltd books